Ambuyah Ebanks (born c. 1985) is the Miss Cayman Islands Pageant 2006 winner. Born to an American mother and a Caymanian father, Ambuyah spent the early years of her childhood growing up in West Bay, Grand Cayman, Cayman Islands. She attended high school in the United States.

At a reception hosted by the Cayman Islands' Governor Stuart Jack on February 20, 2006, she had the opportunity to meet the Premier of Bermuda, Hon. W. Alex Scott JP, MP and his wife Mrs. Olga Scott during their first visit to the Cayman Islands and she gained valuable exposure to regional matters.

Ambuyah competed in the 2006 Miss Universe pageant which was held in Los Angeles, California in July 2006, & in the 2006 Miss World pageant held in Warsaw, Poland in October 2006

External links
Miss Cayman Islands 2006/07 2006 Miss Cayman Islands Committee
Missuniverse.com Miss Universe 2006 Interview
“Ambuyah arrives in Poland traveling light” by  Staff Writer, “Cayman Netnews”, Thursday, September 7, 2006,  retrieved Thursday, September 7, 2006
"Miss World 2006 Contestant" missworld.tv, 56th Miss World Warsaw Poland

Living people
Caymanian models
Miss Universe 2006 contestants
Miss World 2006 delegates
1985 births
Caymanian beauty pageant winners
Caymanian people of American descent